

Ireland
The head of government, or prime minister, of Ireland is known as the Taoiseach and heads a cabinet called the Government. However, since 1919, heads of government in the Irish state have borne a number of titles. Under the short-lived Irish Republic of 1919–22 the head of government was known first as the President of Dáil Éireann and later as the President of the Republic. Under the Irish Free State of 1922–37 the head of government was the President of the Executive Council. There also briefly existed, immediately before the creation of the Irish Free State, an interim office of Chairman of the Provisional Government. For a brief period in 1921 the offices of President of the Republic and Chairman of the Provisional Government existed simultaneously.

Offices

List of officeholders

Northern Ireland
The most recent devolved cabinet in Northern Ireland is the Northern Ireland Executive, established under the Good Friday Agreement. The Executive has been in operation, intermittently, since 1999; but had existed continuously since 2007, but after elections following a government collapsed on 16 January 2017, no Executive was formed until January 2020, when the parties came to an agreement and an Executive was subsequently established. Since 1921, there have been three different prime ministerial offices in Northern Ireland. The most recent structure, the Office of the First Minister and deputy First Minister, represents a diarchy. As such, there is no longer a singular executive office, but rather a dual office.

Offices

List of officeholders

See also 

 Irish head of state from 1936 to 1949
 President of Ireland
 Irish cabinets since 1919
 History of the Republic of Ireland
 History of Northern Ireland
 Politics of the Republic of Ireland
 Politics of Northern Ireland
 Records of Irish heads of government since 1922
 List of chief governors of Ireland (1172–1922)
 List of High Kings of Ireland (up to 1198)

Notes

References

Lists of heads of government
Political history of Ireland
Irish heads of government